The 1957 season of the Paraguayan Primera División, the top category of Paraguayan football, was played by 8 teams. The national champions were Olimpia.

Results

Standings

External links
Paraguay 1957 season at RSSSF

Para
Primera
Paraguayan Primera División seasons